
Qachu Quta (Aymara qachu female, quta lake, "female lake", Hispanicized spelling Cacho Kkota) or Llachu Quta (Aymara llachu seaweed, "seaweed lake", Hispanicized Llacho Kkota) is a Bolivian lake on the west side of the Apolobamba mountain range. It is situated in the La Paz Department, Bautista Saavedra Province, Charasani Municipality, Charasani Canton, northwest of Charasani, southeast of the Janq'u Qala Lake and east of the small lake named Ch'uxña Quta. Qachu Quta is about 0.9 km long and 0.5 km at its widest point and situated at a height of about 4,466 metres (14,652 ft).

See also 
 Apolobamba Integrated Management Natural Area

References 

Lakes of La Paz Department (Bolivia)